Graduation is the act of receiving or conferring an academic degree, or the associated ceremony.

Graduation may also refer to:

 Graduation (scale), the marking of units on a scale such as on a slide rule or instrument

Film and TV
 Graduation (2007 film), an American film starring Chris Marquette and Riley Smith
 Graduation (2016 film), a Romanian film by Cristian Mungiu

Television episodes
 "Graduation" (13 Reasons Why)
 "Graduation" (Boy Meets World)
 "Graduation" (Kim Possible)
 "Graduation" (Malcolm in the Middle)
 "Graduation" (Roswell)
 "Graduation" (The Suite Life of Zack & Cody)

Music
 Graduation, in Japanese idol culture, a final concert performance for a member leaving a group

Albums
 Graduation (album), by Kanye West, 2007
 Graduation (Deen album), 2011
 Graduation: Singles, an album by Nami Tamaki, 2006

Songs
 "Graduation" (Benny Blanco and Juice Wrld song), 2019
 "Graduation (Friends Forever)", a song by Vitamin C, 2000
 "Graduation", a song by Kero Kero Bonito from Bonito Generation, 2016

See also
 Graduation Day (disambiguation)
 
 
 Gradation (disambiguation)
 Graduate (disambiguation)